Wei Kuo-yen (born 5 February 1953) is a Taiwanese politician. He was the Minister of the Environmental Protection Administration since 3 March 2014 until 20 May 2016.

Education and academic career
Wei graduated from National Taiwan University for his bachelor's and master's degrees in geology. He obtained his doctoral degree in oceanography from the University of Rhode Island in the United States. He conducted post-doctoral research at the University of California, Santa Barbara. Wei had taught geology and geophysics as an assistant professor at Yale University.

Political career
Wei was named the Minister of the Environmental Protection Administration in February 2014. After the T.S. Taipei ran aground off the coast of Shimen District on 10 March 2016 and caused an oil spill, Wei attempted to resign.

Personal life
Wei suffered heart attack during a legislative hearing on 31 March 2016 and was admitted to National Taiwan University Hospital.

References

1953 births
Living people
National Taiwan University alumni
Taiwanese Ministers of Environment
University of Rhode Island alumni